Lucille Talks Back is an album by B. B. King, released in 1975. B.B. King produced it himself and recorded it with his own orchestra. It is not to be confused with a compilation of the same name, released in 1988.

The album was out of print until it was re-released as a bonus disc as part of the iTunes edition of the 2012 box set Ladies and Gentlemen... Mr. B. B. King.

Track listing
Side A
"Lucille Talks Back (Copulation)" [ Instr. ] (B.B.King) - 2:25
"Breaking Up Somebody's Home" (Al Jackson, Jr., Timothy Matthews) -- 2:58
"Reconsider Baby" (Lowell Fulson) - 2:53
"Don't Make Me Pay For His Mistakes" (Bobby Lexing, Miles Grayson) - 3:15

Side B
"When I'm Wrong" (B. B. King) - 6:11
"I Know The Price" (B. B. King) -- 3:06
"Have Faith" (Shirrell Sutton)- 2:36
"Everybody Lies A Little" (Jackson, King) -- 3:43

Personnel
B.B. King - guitar, vocals
Jesse Daniel Houck, Milton Hopkins - rhythm guitar
Rudy Aikels - bass guitar
Ron Levy - piano, synthesizer
James Toney - Hammond organ
John "Jabo" Starks - drums
Marcus Barnett - percussion
Bobby Forte - tenor saxophone, baritone saxophone
Cato Walker III - alto saxophone
Herbert Hardisty - tenor saxophone, trumpet
Eddie Rowe - trumpet, flugelhorn
Joseph Burton - trombone
B. B. King, Eddie Rowe, Hampton Reese - arrangements
Technical
Tom Wilkes - art direction
Martin Donald - design
Jim McCrary - photography

References

B.B. King albums
1975 albums
ABC Records albums